Hasse Börjes (born 25 January 1948) is a Swedish speed skater, Olympic silver medalist and former world record holder in the 500 m.

Born in Rättvik, at the 1972 Olympics in Sapporo Börjes was silver medalist at the 500 meter speed skating event. During those games he also was the Swedish flag-bearer during the opening ceremony.

Hasse Börjes improved the world record on 500m three times in 1970 (38.9 seconds, 38.87, and 38.46 seconds), and equaled the then record in 1972 (38.0 seconds).

World records 

Source: SpeedSkatingStats.com

References

External links
 Hasse Börjes at SpeedSkatingStats.com

1948 births
Living people
People from Rättvik Municipality
Speed skaters at the 1968 Winter Olympics
Speed skaters at the 1972 Winter Olympics
Olympic speed skaters of Sweden
Olympic silver medalists for Sweden
Olympic medalists in speed skating
World record setters in speed skating
Medalists at the 1972 Winter Olympics
Swedish male speed skaters
Sportspeople from Dalarna County
20th-century Swedish people